The women's doubles Tournament at the 1992 Matrix Essentials Evert Cup took place between February 24 and March 1 on the outdoor hard courts of the Indian Wells Tennis Garden in Indian Wells, United States. Claudia Kohde-Kilsch and Stephanie Rehe won the title, defeating Jill Hetherington and Kathy Rinaldi in the final.

Seeds

Draw

Finals

Top half

Bottom half

References
 Main Draw

Matrix Essentials Evert Cup Doubles